Heliconius telesiphe, the telesiphe longwing, is a butterfly of the family Nymphalidae. It was described by Edward Doubleday in 1847. It is found at mid-elevations in the Andes. Its habitat is cloud forests.

The wingspan is 65–80 mm. The species is part of a mimicry complex with Podotricha telesiphe.

The larvae mostly feed on Passiflora species from the subgenus Plectostemma. This species assisted in the 1993 discovery of Passiflora telesiphe, a species in the subgenus Decaloba.

Subspecies
Heliconius telesiphe telesiphe (Bolivia)
Heliconius telesiphe cretacea Neustetter, 1916 (Peru)
Heliconius telesiphe sotericus Salvin, 1871 (Ecuador, Peru)

References

External links
 Heliconius telesiphe Insecta.pro: international entomological community

telesiphe
Nymphalidae of South America
Lepidoptera of Brazil
Fauna of the Andes
Butterflies described in 1874
Taxa named by Edward Doubleday